Charles 'Chuck'  Mercein (born April 9, 1943) is a former professional American football running back in the National Football League for seven seasons for the New York Giants, Green Bay Packers, and New York Jets.  He was drafted in the third round, the second player drafted by the New York Giants, the 31st player taken overall in the draft. He led the Giants in rushing in his second season and after an injury was claimed on waivers and joined the Green Bay Packers midway thru the season. As a professional, Mercein is  best remembered for his performance in the Packers' game-winning drive in the 1967 NFL Championship Game, known popularly as the "Ice Bowl". Mercein rushed six times for 20 yards, and had two receptions for 22 yards in the "Ice Bowl"; 34 of his total yards were achieved on that game's final and famous 68 yard drive. He most notably raised both of his arms behind Bart Starr who had executed a quarterback sneak to score the game-winning touchdown with 16 seconds remaining in regulation time. Because physically aiding a teammate into the end zone is a penalty, he was indicating to the on-field officials that Starr wasn't pushed forward. He played for the Packers through 1969 and then with the Jets before retiring in 1971. Prior to being with the Jets, he was in Washington Redskins training camp but was released on September 1, 1970.

Early years
Mercein is the son of Tom Mercein, a radio and television personality who worked in Milwaukee, Chicago and New York City during the 1950s and 1960s. The younger Mercein graduated from New Trier High School in 1961. He was an all-state fullback who also was the first Illinois high-school athlete to ever exceed 60 feet in the shot put. His feats of 61 feet, 1¾ inches at Waukegan on April 29, 1961 and 60 feet, 5½ inches at Maine East six days later on May 5 both exceeded the then-state record of 58 feet, 5½ inches. Neither were recognized as an Illinois high school record, which had to be established only at the state championships.

Mercein's acceptance of a scholarship to attend Yale College was based on recommendations from Mike Pyle, a fellow New Trier graduate who had also matriculated at Yale. While at Yale, Mercein was a member of the Phi Chapter of Delta Kappa Epsilon fraternity.

References

1943 births
Living people
New York Giants players
Green Bay Packers players
New York Jets players
Players of American football from Milwaukee
Yale College alumni
New Trier High School alumni